State Road 40 (SR 40) is a  east–west route across northern and east-central Florida, running from U.S. Route 41 (US 41) in Rainbow Lakes Estates eastwards through Ocala over the Ocklawaha River and bridge and through the heart of the Ocala National Forest to State Road A1A in Ormond Beach. Names of the road include Silver Springs Boulevard in Ocala, Fort Brooks Road from Silver Springs through Astor, Butler Road in Astor, and Granada Boulevard in Ormond Beach. Former sections in Ormond Beach are named "Old Tomoka Road" and "Old Tomoka Avenue."

Route description

The segment maintained by FDOT begins at US 41 north of the entrance to Rainbow Springs State Park, where it moves at a northeast angle before crossing under a narrow railroad bridge. The road passes by the Ocala International Airport before entering the city limits and crossing under Interstate 75 at Exit 352. East of I-75 SR 40 continues as a four-lane divided highway where it passes the site of the former Region #5 Headquarters of the Florida Department of Transportation. CSX's S-Line, which once carried the Amtrak Palmetto runs beneath the road before intersecting with US 27-301-441. East of the triplex, SR 40 climbs a hill and passes just north of the Ocala Historic Commercial District, and south of the Ocala Union Station. At the intersection of Northeast 25th Street SR 40 turns northeast where it gains a wide tree-lined divider. It passes along the northern edge of the Ocala Golf Club,  then serves as the western terminus of CR 314 (Northeast 7th Street) and the eastern terminus of State Road 492 (Northeast 14th Street), and later the Appleton Museum of Art, which includes the Ocala Civic Theatre.

From there, the divider ends as the road enters Silver Springs, Florida where it intersects with the northern terminus of State Road 35 and southern terminus of County Road 35 at the Silver Springs Nature Theme Park. Before the entrance to this park, a major segment of the Florida Black Bear Scenic Byway begins along the route. The road runs along the north side of Silver Springs State Park, where it serves as the eastern terminus of State Road 326 and the southern terminus of CR 315, before it climbs the Bert Dosh Memorial Bridge in order to cross the Ocklawaha River, which was also intended to be part of the Cross Florida Barge Canal, and is now part of the Cross Florida Greenway and the Florida National Scenic Trail. Shortly after descending from that bridge, the highway intersects CR 314 for the second time, and then passes through Lynne where it intersects CR 314A, before bisecting the Ocala National Forest. Toward the eastern edge of the Juniper Springs Recreation Area, SR 40 approaches the intersection with State Road 19. Immediately after the SR 19 intersection, the road crosses the Marion-Lake County line and runs along an overlook and camping area at Wildcat Lake. East of the intersection of CR 445 & CR 445A in Astor Park, it passes through Astor where it crosses the St. Johns River via the Astor Bridge. Immediately across the bridge, on the east bank of the St. Johns River,  SR 40 passes through the unincorporated community of Volusia, one of the first European settlements in Florida, and the area for which Volusia, County was named.

As the road leaves Lake George State Forest and enters Barberville, it shifts to the northeast at the intersection of Lemmon Road, then intersects CR 3 and then the Barberville Flea Market and Post Office before a railroad crossing for the CSX "A" line a block west of the intersection of U.S. Route 17. The road curves back east, and then northeast again as it passes along the south side of Volusia Speedway Park before the intersection of State Road 11 in DeLeon Springs. From there, the road bisects the Tomoka Wildlife Management Area Union-Camp Tract and, after passing by some residential areas and intersecting Country Acres Boulevard, the road goes from two lanes to four as turns back into a divided highway. Despite officially entering the City of Ormond Beach, the highway runs along the north side of Tiger Bay State Forest and the Dan Rice Airport, but then becomes more suburban as it approaches the vicinity of the Tomoka River where the Florida Black Bear Scenic Byway ends just before Interstate 95 at Exit 268 which is a block away from CR 4009. 

East of I-95 & CR 4009, the road curves northeast again as it runs along residential areas along the Tomoka River, until it curves east before crossing over a bridge over one of its tributaries, just west of the intersection of State Road 5A (North and South Nova Road). The road makes one last left curve at Old Tomoka Avenue before approaching the grade crossing of the Florida East Coast Railroad main line, and then intersects with US 1 (North and South Yonge Street). The route continues, but the divider ends as SR 40 comes in close proximity to Ormond Beach City Hall on the southwest corner of Granada Boulevard and Beach Street(CR 4011). From there, SR 40 is overlapped by the Ormond Scenic Loop and Trail, where the divider begins again on the Granada Bridge over the Halifax River, and immediately intersects John Anderson Drive(CR 2803), where one leg of the scenic route heads north and West Granada Boulevard becomes East Granda Boulevard, before finally terminating at State Road A1A. The other leg of the Ormond Beach Scenic Loop heads north on SR A1A. Despite the fact that SR 40 terminates at SR A1A, East Granada Boulevard continues as a beach access road.

Related routes

County extensions west of US 41

A western extension of SR 40 continues from US 41 in Dunnellon as County Road 40 to the Gulf of Mexico through Marion and Levy Counties north of the Withlacoochee River. County Road 40 is named Follow That Dream Parkway west of US 19/98 after the 1962 Elvis Presley movie that was filmed in Inglis, Yankeetown and the surrounding area. East of US  19-98, the road is known as Port Avenue in Levy County, and Cedar Street, then Pennsylvania Avenue in Dunnellon. Between Dunnellon and Rainbow Lakes Estates, SR 40 serves as a not-so-hidden route along US 41.

County Road 40A

County Road 40A is a suffixed alternate of County Road 40, along Southeast 193rd Place. It begins at the intersection of CR 40 and Allen Park Road and 63rd Street and briefly runs northeast until curving to the east where it runs mostly parallel to the north side of CR 40 into Inglis, where it moves further away from Follow That Dream Boulevard then terminates at US 19/98.

History
The route was established in the 1945 renumbering.

Future
A proposed expansion of SR 40 resulted in the State Road 40 Environmental Feasibility Study, which reviewed potential impact of improvements to the existing highway while not destroying the natural beauty of the area.

Major intersections

References

External links

Florida Route Log (SR 40)
Florida Black Bear Scenic Byway (Florida Scenic Highways)

040
SR040
040
040
040
040
040
1945 establishments in Florida